The Black Radical Congress or BRC is an organization founded in 1998 in Chicago. It is a grassroots network of individuals and organizations of African descent focused on advocating for broad progressive social justice, racial equality and economic justice goals within the United States.

History

At the organizing congress in Chicago in June 1998, 2,000 people participated in creating the organization. However, their first mission predates the organizing congress, having been publicly endorsed and published by a number of high-profile black scholars and activists on 16 March 1998.

On 17 April 1999, the BRC ratified a "freedom agenda" listing 15 objectives dealing with racial and economic justice in the United States. The National Council of the BRC adopted a mission statement on 26 September 1999 in East St. Louis, Illinois. The opening paragraph states:

The purpose of the Black Radical Congress (BRC) is to promote dialogue among African American activists and scholars on the left; to discuss critical issues on the national and international scene that pertain to the Black community; to explore new strategies and directions for progressive political, social and cultural movements; and to renew the Black radical movement through increased unified action.

The complete mission statement  discusses approaches to radical democratic methods involving conferences, forums and publications. "Principles of unity" were also adopted, stating that the BRC was established as a "center without walls" focusing on "transformative politics that focuses on the conditions of Black working and poor people."

A national organizing conference was convened in Detroit in 2000, and other conferences have taken place in subsequent years.

Organization

The BRC has both individual and organizational memberships. It is headed by a National Congress.

Each year, the BRC chooses a different "theme" to focus its work on; past themes have included anti-militarism and the prison-industrial complex.

The BRC has at least two caucuses, subgroups within the organization, the labor and working-class caucus and the Pat Parker Queer Caucus.

The BRC has local chapters in Washington, D.C.; the San Francisco Bay Area; Sacramento, California; Minneapolis; St. Louis; New York City; Raleigh, North Carolina; Philadelphia and Pittsburgh.

Principles

Race and racial justice

The BRC states: "Black is not necessarily a color or hue, but encompasses all peoples of African descent." Their work is focused on racial justice as well as broader social and economic justice as it intersects with the politics of race and racial oppression.

Radical politics

"Radical means getting to the root causes of society's injustices and working for root-level, fundamental change. Radicalism is an honored tradition in Black political history."

The BRC has many ties to the Communist Party, USA, although the Congress does not explicitly identify itself as communist, socialist or Marxist.

Endorsers

A number of high-profile black scholars and activists endorsed the creation of the BRC on 16 March 1998:

 Marlene Archer (National Co-chair, National Conference of Black Lawyers)
 Amina Baraka (Communist Party, USA)
 Amiri Baraka (Unity & Struggle newspaper)
 Debbie Bell (Communist Party, USA)
 Angela Y. Davis (Professor, University of California at Santa Cruz)
 Johanna Fernandez (International Socialist Organization)
 Bill Fletcher, Jr. (Labor activist and writer, Washington, D.C., Democratic Socialists of America)
 Lewis Gordon (Temple University)
 Robin D. G. Kelley (University of Southern California)
 Marian Kramer (National Welfare Rights Union)
 Julianne Malveaux
 Manning Marable
   Barbara Ransby, African American Women in Defense of Ourselves, writer and historian
 Sonia Sanchez (poet)
 Joe Sims (Communist Party, USA)
 Yicki Smith (Feminist Action Network)
 Jarvis Tyner (Communist Party, USA)
 Cornel West (Democratic Socialists of America)

See also
Black Lives Matter
Nation of Islam

External links
 Black Radical Congress website

Publications

 "From Conference to Organization: The Challenges of Building the Black Radical Congress", by Jamala Rogers
 "Global Apartheid and America's New Racial Domain", by Manning Marable
 "Rosa Parks: A Woman of Substance", by Eric Foner, discussing the life and death of Rosa Parks
 "The Left and the Millions More Movement", by Amiri Baraka
 "We Charge Genocide", by Jamala Rogers, discussing Hurricane Katrina
 "The terrorist named Hurricane Katrina", by Bill Fletcher, Jr., discussing Hurricane Katrina
 "Whither the Struggle Against Racism", by Rose Brewer, discussing the World Social Forum in Porto Alegre, Brazil in 2005
 "Contemporary Police Brutality and Misconduct" press release, undated
 "We Must Succeed!! The Black Radical Congress Campaign" press release, undated
 "African Leaders Hide Political Woes Behind Homophobia", press release, 25 April 2001
 "Statement on the Giuliani "Decency" Panel", press release, 12 April 2001
 "Statement on the Post-Election Crisis by the National Coordinating Committee of the BRC", press release, 1 December 2000
 "The Black Radical Congress Condemns the Acquittal of Four Police Officers in the Murder of Amadou Diallo", press release, 28 February 2000

References

Organizations established in 1998
1998 establishments in Illinois
African-American leftism
African-American organizations
Black Power
Identity politics in the United States
Community organizations
Democratic socialist organizations in the United States
Social democratic organizations in the United States